Vaman Ramachandra Kokatnur (1887 – 18 April 1950) was an American chemist of Indian origin. He was an industrial chemist with Niagara Alkali Company and patented several chemical processes, particularly the use of catalysts in organic synthesis.

Kokatnur was born in Kokatnur, Athani, and after a BSc from Bombay University (1912) he moved to the US, graduating MS from the University of Minnesota in 1914. He received a Shevlin fellowship during this period. He became an American citizen in 1921. In 1928, he was sent to Russia as a consultant for the production of chlorine and caustic soda. During World War II he was drafted into the Navy as a special consultant with the rank of captain. Like many Indian immigrants into the US in the period he supported Indian Independence while considering caste and class hierarchies as necessities in society.

In 1948, he examined chemistry in ancient Indian literature and claimed that the ancients must have had considerable knowledge based on his interpretation of various arms mentioned in translations of the Ramayana that he examined. He was noted as being interested in the hieroglyphics which he believed was related to Sanskrit. At a meeting of the American Chemical Society he claimed that Indians had discovered hydrogen and oxygen and that chemistry was of "Aryan origin". He said he had identified this from a four page manuscript from 1550 claimed to be the Agastya Samhita or writings of Sage Agastya who supposedly lived in 2000 BC. According to Kokatnur, the work actually described electrolysis and that the gods Mitra and Varuna mentioned were to be interpreted as Mitra meaning friend, and therefore as the cathode, and Varuna meaning liquid or enemy of zinc and therefore referring to the anode. He claimed that the term "prana" meant vital to life and therefore indicated oxygen while "udana" meant facing upward and therefore identified it as being hydrogen. About the source and its provenance he claimed that it could not have been a fake because the paper appeared to be older than 50 years and that the discoveries to prevent polarization had only just been made. His work was supposedly to be published in the science history journal Isis but possibly due to the doubtful provenance of sources and the rather vague interpretations, was never published.

References

External links 

 MS thesis - The action of trioxymethylene on the various organic compounds in the presence of aluminium chloride.
 Patents -                    

1887 births
1950 deaths
People from Belgaum
American chemists
University of Minnesota alumni
Emigrants from British India to the United States